Steven "Steve" Jehu (born 1 April 1987) is a British artistic gymnast from Exeter, Devon. In October 2010 he was part of the team which won the silver medal for England in the gymnastics in the men's artistic all-around team event at the 2010 Commonwealth Games. 
  
In 2004, Jehu survived a 33-foot fall from a hotel window in Ljubljana, Slovenia by completing a mid-air loop and gymnasts' landing to escape with only a broken ankle. The attending doctor who operated on his ankle said that he would have died if he hadn't used his gymnastic skills.

References

External links
 

1987 births
Living people
British male artistic gymnasts
English male artistic gymnasts
Commonwealth Games medallists in gymnastics
Commonwealth Games silver medallists for England
Gymnasts at the 2010 Commonwealth Games
Sportspeople from Penzance
Medallists at the 2010 Commonwealth Games